Ophiusa legendrei is a moth of the family Erebidae first described by Pierre Viette in 1967. It is found on the Comoros, Réunion, Madagascar and in Mozambique.

Ophiusa legendrei is one of the few insects present on Europa Island.

The larvae feed on Schinus terebinthifolius.

References

Moths described in 1967
Ophiusa
Moths of Madagascar
Lepidoptera of Mozambique
Moths of the Comoros
Moths of Réunion
Moths of Sub-Saharan Africa